Trevor Robert Milton (born April 6, 1982) is an American convicted felon, former businessman and the founder and former chairman and CEO of Nikola Corporation. In September 2020, Milton resigned from his position as chairman after the U.S. Securities and Exchange Commission and Department of Justice began investigating claims that Milton and Nikola committed securities fraud. In July 2021, Milton was indicted by federal prosecutors on three counts of securities fraud and wire fraud and released on $100 million bail. In June 2022, he was charged with another count of wire fraud. In October 2022, he was found guilty on three of the four counts.

Early life and education
Milton was born in Layton, Utah to Bill Milton, a Union Pacific Railroad manager, and Sally Milton, a realtor. He has a brother and three sisters. The family moved to Las Vegas when Milton was a toddler, but returned to Utah when he was eight. When he was 15 years old, his mother died from cancer.

Milton is a member of the Church of Jesus Christ of Latter-day Saints (LDS) and, after high school, went on an 18-month church mission to Brazil. He dropped out of college after one semester at Utah Valley University to pursue a career in sales and marketing.

Career
Milton started an alarm sales company called St. George Security and Alarm immediately after quitting college and eventually exited the business for a stated $300,000, though his former business partner claims he was led to believe the exit payment was "much smaller." Milton then launched an online classified ads website selling used cars, which eventually failed.

Afterwards, Milton founded an alternative energy vehicle company called dHybrid, Inc. which retrofitted commercial trucks with engines that could run on natural gas instead of diesel. After entering into a deal with an investor for a large stake in dHybrid, Milton claimed that "the investor was taking [their] intellectual property", resulting in dHybrid Inc suing the investor and Milton closing the company. Milton then started dHybrid Systems, which was similar to the previous company except with a greater focus on building natural gas and hydrogen storage systems. According to Milton, dHybrid was purchased by Worthington Industries.

In 2015, Milton founded Nikola Motor Company with an initial investment of $2 million from Worthington. Trevor was the CEO in Nikola's early years.  In June 2020, as part of a reverse merger with VectoIQ in order to have Nikola go public, Milton became executive chairman of the board and turned over the CEO role to President Mark Russell.

Fraud allegations and trial 

On September 10, 2020, two days after Nikola established ties with General Motors, short seller Hindenburg Research released a report accusing Milton of making false statements over the course of many years and characterizing Nikola Motor Company as "an intricate fraud." It was later revealed that Hindenburg Research was working with a Nikola whistleblower using the Twitter handle @InsiderNikola for the report and that amateur private investigators were surveilling them on behalf of the company. Nikola's stock fell by eight percent that day and fell an additional 15 percent the following day, after Milton failed to deliver his rebuttal as he previously promised on Twitter. Further verification by Bloomberg and the Financial Times confirmed some of the details in the report. Nikola denied the allegations of fraud outlined in the report and said it contained misleading information.

, Nikola Motor Company was being sued by at least one law firm representing shareholders for possible fraud.

On September 14, 2020, the Wall Street Journal and others reported that the Securities and Exchange Commission (SEC) and Department of Justice (DOJ) had started an investigation into potential securities fraud committed by Milton and Nikola.

On September 20, 2020, Milton resigned from his position as Executive Chairman of Nikola Corporation, just weeks after tweeting that "cowards run, leaders stay and fight". As part of his exit package, Milton remained an unpaid consultant to Nikola until December 2020. He was not allowed to comment about Nikola on social media, online blogs, or any other internet platforms without permission from the company. Milton retained 91.6 million shares of Nikola that were worth roughly $3.1 billion in late September 2020.

On September 22, 2020, a rumor appeared on a Twitter satire account claiming Milton had been arrested by the Federal Bureau of Investigation and DOJ at Sky Harbor Airport in Phoenix, Arizona. The tweet was picked up by Techcrunch and other major outlets; hours later, it was revealed as a hoax, and Techcrunch publicly apologized. Following the public attention, Milton deactivated his Twitter and Instagram accounts.

In July 2021, a United States federal grand jury returned an indictment against Trevor Milton that included three counts of securities fraud and wire fraud. He also faces civil securities fraud charges from the SEC. He surrendered to authorities. Milton pled not guilty to the charges and was freed on $100 million bail. In June 2022, Milton was charged with an additional wire fraud charge. In October 2022, after a day of deliberation, the jury found Milton guilty on one count of securities fraud and two counts of wire fraud.

Sexual misconduct allegations 
In September 2020, Aubrey Ferrin Smith, Milton's cousin, accused him of sexually assaulting her at their grandfather’s funeral in 1999, when she was 15 and he was 18. The Wall Street Journal later confirmed several details of the accusation, including that Smith was, indeed, Milton's cousin and that Smith had told family members about the incident months after it had allegedly occurred. Family members also told the Wall Street Journal that religious authorities were notified, but no charges were filed. CNBC later confirmed that Smith had filed a formal complaint with the local police in Holladay, Utah where the alleged assault took place. A sergeant with the Unified Police Department confirmed that the complaint had been filled. CNBC additionally confirmed that in 2017 when the #MeToo movement was taking place, Smith published an account of the assault on Facebook without identifying Milton by name.

On September 28, 2020, CNBC reported that a second anonymous woman had come forward claiming that she had been assaulted by Milton. The alleged incident is said to have occurred in 2004 when the alleged victim was 15 and Milton was 22. The alleged assault is being investigated by the local police. Milton reportedly bragged to a friend that he "took her virginity in the theater room" and reportedly said "I like young girls and I like virgins because they are naïve."

Milton has denied the allegations, saying through a spokesperson, “At no point in his life has Mr. Milton ever engaged in any inappropriate physical contact with anyone." On October 5, 2020, Milton sued Utah businessman David Bateman in Utah Federal District Court for defamation per se for publishing allegations against Milton, including that he was involved in sex trafficking and has assaulted numerous unnamed women.

Personal life
Milton lives in Phoenix, Arizona with his wife, Chelsey Bergmann, whom he married in 2017. In November 2019, the Los Angeles Times reported that Milton had bought a 2,000-acre Utah ranch with a 16,800 square foot riverside mansion for $32.5 million. The purchase price set a new record for a home in the state.

In September 2020, Forbes assessed Milton's net worth to be at at least $3.1 billion, as he owned about 25% of Nikola, which was valued at about $12.4 billion at the time.

References

External links 

 CNBC Interview: Nikola executive chairman Trevor Milton on the company's public debut
 Q&A podcast with Trevor Milton, focusing on Nikola's financials and technology

1982 births
Living people
American billionaires
American company founders
American chief executives in the automobile industry
American people convicted of mail and wire fraud
People from Phoenix, Arizona